Hygrophoropsis rufescens is a species of fungus in the family Hygrophoropsidaceae. Originally described as Cantharellus rufescens by French mycologist Lucien Quélet in 1886, it was transferred to Hygrophoropsis by Rolf Singer in 1986.

References

External links

Hygrophoropsidaceae
Fungi described in 1886
Fungi of Europe